Ventosa may refer to the following places:

 Ventosa, Asturias, Spain
 Ventosa, La Rioja, Spain
 Ventosa (Alenquer), Portugal
 Ventosa de la Cuesta,  Castile and León, Spain
 Ventosa del Río Almar, Castile and León, Spain